Lapčević is a Serbian surname, possibly a demonym of Lapčevo. It may refer to:

Dragiša Lapčević (1867–1939), Serbian politician, journalist, and historian
Ivan Lapčević (born 1976), Serbian handballer
 Sarah Lapčević (born 1986), Serbian clinical psychologist and psychotherapist specialised in psychotraumatology

Serbian surnames